Piranha 3D is a 2010 American 3D horror comedy film that serves as a loose remake of the comedy horror film Piranha (1978) and an entry in the Piranha film series. Directed by Alexandre Aja and written by Pete Goldfinger and Josh Stolberg, the film stars Elisabeth Shue, Adam Scott, Jerry O'Connell, Ving Rhames, Jessica Szohr, Steven R. McQueen, Christopher Lloyd and Richard Dreyfuss. During spring break on Lake Victoria, a popular waterside resort, an underground tremor releases hundreds of prehistoric, carnivorous piranhas into the lake. Local cop Julie Forester (Elisabeth Shue) must join forces with a band of unlikely strangers—though they are badly outnumbered—to destroy the ravenous creatures before everyone becomes fish food.

Piranha 3D was theatrically released in the United States on August 30, 2010, by Dimension Films. The film received generally positive reviews, with film critics praising it as a fun and entertaining B-movie. It was a box office success, grossing over $83 million worldwide against a $24 million budget. A sequel, Piranha 3DD, was released in 2012 to critical and commercial failure.

Plot

Fisherman Matt Boyd is fishing in Lake Victoria, Arizona when a small earthquake hits, splitting the lake floor and causing a whirlpool. Boyd falls in and is eaten by a school of prehistoric piranhas that emerge from the chasm.

As spring break begins, Jake Forester reunites with his old crush Kelly and meets her arrogant boyfriend, Todd Dupree. Jake meets Derrick Jones, a sleazy pornographer as well as Danni, one of his actresses. Derrick convinces Jake to show him good spots on the lake for filming a pornographic movie. Jake's mother, Sheriff Julie Forester, searches for the missing Matt Boyd with Deputy Fallon. They find his mutilated body and contemplate closing the lake. However, this decision is made difficult with thousands of partying college students on spring break, which is important for bringing revenue to the small town. The next morning, a lone cliff diver is attacked and devoured by the piranhas.

Jake's siblings Zane and Laura take a canoe to go fishing on a small sandbar island and become stranded in the middle of the lake due to Zane neglecting to properly secure the canoe. Jake runs into Kelly, who accepted Derrick's invitation on board his boat, and meets Derrick's other actress Crystal and his cameraman Andrew.

Julie takes a team of seismologist divers: Novak, Sam, and Paula to the fissure. Novak speculates that the rift leads to a buried prehistoric lake. Paula and Sam scuba dive to the bottom and discover a big cavern filled with large piranha egg stocks. Both are eaten by the piranhas before they can alert the others. Novak and Julie find Paula's corpse and pull it onto the boat, capturing a lone piranha, which they take to Carl Goodman, a retired marine biologist. He explains that this piranha is a super-aggressive prehistoric species known as Pygocentrus nattereri, or the Original Piranha, long believed to have been extinct for over 2 million years, and theorizes that the piranhas must have survived through cannibalism. The species is able to vigorously devour its prey in seconds.

Julie, Novak, Fallon and Deputy Taylor Roberts try to evacuate the lake but their warnings are ignored until the piranhas begin to attack the tourists, turning the party into a bloodbath. Novak boards a jet-ski with a shotgun to help while the rest of the team try to save the others. Almost everyone in the lake is either brutally wounded or killed by the piranhas, including Todd, whose boat capsizes as he attempts to escape. Fallon makes a last stand, taking a boat motor and using its propeller as a makeshift chainsaw to kill some of the piranhas, but he loses his legs in the process.

Meanwhile, Jake spots Laura and Zane on the island and forces Derrick to rescue them. Derrick accidentally crashes the boat into some submerged rocks in the process, flooding the lower deck and causing the boat to begin sinking. Kelly is trapped in the galley while Derrick, Crystal and Andrew fall overboard. Andrew escapes to the shore, but Crystal is devoured and Derrick is badly wounded. Danni manages to get a partially-eaten Derrick back on board, where he eventually dies.

Julie and Novak reach Jake on a speedboat and attach a rope to his boat. Julie, Danni, Laura and Zane start crossing the rope, but the piranhas latch onto Danni's hair, causing her to fall into the water, where she is ripped apart and devoured. The others make it across safely, but the rope comes loose. Jake ties the line to himself and goes to save Kelly. He ties her to him and lights a flare after releasing the gas from stored propane tanks. Novak speeds the boat away just as the piranhas surround Kelly and Jake. They are dragged to safety as the propane tanks explode, killing most of the piranhas.

A terrified Mr. Goodman calls Julie, who tells him that they seem to have killed the majority of the piranhas. Goodman tells her that the reproductive glands on the piranha they obtained were not mature, which means the fish they have killed were only the babies. As Novak wonders aloud where the mature ones are, an adult human-sized piranha leaps out of the water and eats him.

Cast

 Elisabeth Shue as Sheriff Julie Forester
 Steven R. McQueen as Jake Forester
 Adam Scott as Novak
 Jerry O'Connell as Derrick Jones
 Jessica Szohr as Kelly
 Kelly Brook as Danni
 Riley Steele as Crystal
 Ving Rhames as Deputy Fallon
 Dina Meyer as Paula
 Christopher Lloyd as Carl Goodman
 Richard Dreyfuss as Matt Boyd
 Ricardo Chavira as Sam
 Paul Scheer as Andrew Cunningham
 Cody Longo as Todd Dupree
 Sage Ryan as Zane Forester
 Brooklynn Proulx as Laura Forester
 Devra Korwin as Mrs. Goodman

Richard Dreyfuss said that he accepted the role after Bob Weinstein persuaded him by offering him a larger salary, which Dreyfuss later donated to charity. Dreyfuss also stated that the ill-fated character he plays is a parody and a near-reincarnation of Matt Hooper, the character he portrayed in the film Jaws (1975), with whom his character shares the same first name. Jaws was the inspiration for the first movie in the "Piranha" film series, 1978's Piranha.   The song the character in Piranha 3D listens to on the radio on his boat is "Show Me the Way to Go Home", which Richard Dreyfuss, Roy Scheider and Robert Shaw sing together aboard Quint's boat the Orca in Jaws.

Eli Roth, Ashlynn Brooke, Bonnie Morgan, Genevieve Alexandra and Gianna Michaels appear as spring breakers who meet gruesome demises, while Franck Khalfoun and Jason Spisak portray deputies.

Joe Dante (director of the original Piranha) and James Cameron (director of Piranha II: The Spawning) were chosen to be roles of boat captains who give safety lessons to the teens. But this role was turn down because Cameron was too busy.

Production

Development
Then-up-and-coming screenwriters Josh Stolberg and Pete Goldfinger wrote a spec script entitled Killer Fish for producer J. Todd Harris, the rights owner  hired for Piranha due to their limited credentials at the time. Harris was impressed with the script and the duo were officially hired. In 2004, hot off the success of his film High Tension, French director Alexandre Aja was given an offer to direct the film, titled Piranha: Lake Havasu. Aja admired the script but wanted to tone down the script's comedic aspects in favor of more "suspense and tension". By June 2005, Chuck Russell was scheduled to direct the film, and made heavy rewrites to the Stolberg/Goldfinger draft, as well as incorporating elements from the original John Sayles script that Joe Dante directed the first time around. Chiller Films and Mark Canton were slated to produce the film, while Dimension Films acquired the distribution rights in January 2006. Russell's vision for the film, which would have cost an estimated $23 million, was described as an "underwater thriller" as opposed to Stolberg and Goldfinger's draft, which took place during spring break. By December 2006, filming was planned to begin in spring 2007. By March 2007, Aja circled back to the project as Russell would depart as director. Along with directing, Aja signed on to produce the film and rewrite the script with his filmmaking partner Grégory Levasseur.

Pre-production
In April 2009, Elisabeth Shue, Adam Scott, Ving Rhames and Richard Dreyfuss were cast in the film. The following month, Jessica Szohr, Jerry O'Connell, and Christopher Lloyd joined the cast. Dreyfuss, at first hesitant to make fun of his career, eventually agreed to do the film after getting a higher payment from the producers.

Filming
Production on the film was scheduled to begin late 2008, but was delayed until March 2009. In October 2008, Aja stated filming would begin in the spring. He further stated "It's such a difficult movie, not only because of the technicality of it and the CGI fish, but also because it all happens in a lake. We were supposed to start shooting now, but the longer to leave it the colder the water gets. The movie takes place during Spring Break and, of course, the studio wanted it ready for the summer, but if you've got 1,000 people who need to get murdered in the water, you have to wait for the right temperature for the water, for the weather, for everything."

Shooting took place in May 2009 at Bridgewater Channel in Lake Havasu, located in Lake Havasu City, Arizona. The water was also dyed red for the shooting. An estimated 80,000 gallons of fake blood was used during filming.

Asked about her underwater sequence with Riley Steele, Kelly Brook said, "It was really difficult. Holding your breath while making out with someone as hot as Steele. I had to learn to hold my breath for a very long time." Brook also said that the pair had to have "a lot of practice" before filming the scene.

Post-production
Citing constraints with 3D camera rigs, Aja shot Piranha in 2D and converted to 3D in post production using a 3D conversion process developed by Michael Roderick and used by the company, Inner-D. Unlike some other 3D converted films released in 2010, Piranha'''s conversion was not done as an afterthought, and it was one of the first post-conversion processes to be well received by critics.

Eight years after the film's release, Aja spoke of post-production disputes that occurred while finishing the film. He claimed that Dimension found effects artist that were much cheaper than the ones they had currently employed, this included artists who never did conversion work before. By June 2010, not a single piranha was completed for the film, leading to Aja reaching out to the Directors Guild of America to remove his name from the credits out of frustration. Bob Weinstein caught wind of this and fired all the artists and instead hired every VFX vendor available to finish the film. On top of this, executive producer Harvey Weinstein supposedly hated the film, expecting it to be more in line with Jaws, instead of "Jaws Gone Wild" as Aja put it.

ReleasePiranha 3Ds theatrical release date had been set for April 16, 2010, but was delayed. The film was planned to premiere on August 27, 2010, but in June 2010 was moved to August 20, 2010. The film's first trailer debuted with Avatar. A second trailer was shown in prints of A Nightmare on Elm Street and Inception. It was set to have a panel on 24 July 2010 as part of the San Diego Comic-Con International but was cancelled after convention organizers decided the footage that was planned to be shown was not appropriate. Nine minutes of footage, with some unfinished effects, were leaked onto websites. The clip used in promotional television ads and the trailer that shows Jessica Szohr's character, Kelly, face to face with a pack of piranhas was not used in the movie, and was used for promotion only.

The official poster was released June 22, 2010.

Box officePiranha 3D grossed $10,106,872 in its first 3 days, opening at No. 6 in the United States box office. In the United Kingdom, Piranha 3D opened at No. 4 at the box office, earning £1,487,119. As of May 16, 2011, Piranha 3D has made $83,188,165 worldwide.

ReceptionPiranha 3D received generally positive reviews. It holds a "Certified Fresh" approval rating of 74% on the review aggregator Rotten Tomatoes and an average score of 6.2/10, based on 127 reviews. The consensus reads "Playing exactly to expectations for a movie about killer fish run amok, Piranha 3-D dishes out gore, guffaws and gratuitous nudity with equal glee." On Metacritic, which assigns a normalized rating out of 100 to reviews from mainstream critics, the film has received a score of 53, based on 20 reviews, which indicates "mixed or average reviews". A tongue-in-cheek scholarly review of the movie was written for the journal Copeia (Chakrabarty & Fink 2011), which reviewed the movie as if it were a documentary film. Audiences polled by CinemaScore gave the film an average grade of "C" on an A+ to F scale.Empire gave the film three out of five stars, saying "Remember the film you hoped Snakes on a Plane would be – this is it! By any sane cinematic standards, meretricious trash ... but thrown at you with such good-humoured glee that it's hard to resist. It's a bumper-sticker of a movie: honk if you love tits and gore! Honk honk honk." Christy Lemire, film critic for the Associated Press, said "Run, don't walk: Piranha 3D is hilariously, cleverly gory. Mere words cannot describe how awesomely gnarly Piranha 3D is, how hugely entertaining, and how urgently you must get yourself to the theatre to see it. Like, now." HollywoodLife.com called the film "a campy masterpiece of a movie", adding "If you have an ounce of fun in your body, you will love this movie about killer piranhas that overtake a town of hottiesin 3D!" Peter Hall of Cinematical.com said "The gore, the nudity, the language, the gags, the charactersit's all always on the rise. Just when you think things could not possibly get more ridiculous, that the film has peaked, Aja and screenwriters Pete Goldfinger and Josh Stolberg manage to ram another syringe of adrenaline into its heart." The Hollywood Reporter referred to the film as "a pitch-perfect, guilty-pleasure serving of late-summer schlock that handily nails the tongue-in-cheek spirit of the Roger Corman original" while stating "Jaws it ain'tAja exhibits little patience for such stuff as dramatic tension and tautly coiled suspense, and there are some undeniable choppy bits...but he never loses sight of the potential fun factor laid out in Pete Goldfinger and Josh Stolberg's script." The Orlando Sentinel gave the film one and a half stars out of four, stating that "Piranha 3D goes for the jugular. And generally misses, but generally in an amusing way."

Home media
The film was released on DVD, Blu-ray, and Blu-ray 3D formats on January 11, 2011. The "3D" part of the title was taken off the 2D releases to prevent confusion of the two formats. The film was released in Australia on December 30, 2010. The film was shown on British television on Channel 5 on February 10, 2013, for the first time, and in 2D format.

Music

Lakeshore Records released the soundtrack album of Piranha 3D which included mostly rap, dance, hip-hop and R&B music. Artists include Shwayze, Envy, Flatheads, Amanda Blank, Public Enemy, Dub Pistols, and Hadouken!.

Track listing

Songs not included on the soundtrack
 "Show Me the Way to Go Home" by Mitch Miller & The Gang
 "I'm Not a Whore" by LMFAO
 "Fetish" by Far East Movement
 "Girls on the Dance Floor" by Far East Movement

Credits
 A&r [Director] – Eric Craig 
 Cello [Electric Cello], Guitar, Percussion, Programmed By – Michael Wandmacher 
 Composed By – Susie Benchasil Seiter 
 Conductor – Michael Wandmacher 
 Edited By [Music] – Joshua Winget 
 Executive Producer [Executive Producer For Lakeshore Records] – Brian McNelis, Skip Williamson 
 Mixed By – Mark Curry (3) 
 Orchestrated By – Chad Seiter, Michael Wandmacher, Susie Benchasil Seiter 
 Producer – Michael Wandmacher

Sequel

Dimension Films announced a sequel shortly after the first film was released. The film is Piranha 3DD and is directed by John Gulager with Patrick Melton and Marcus Dunstan writing. It was released on June 1, 2012. It stars Danielle Panabaker, Matt Bush, David Koechner, Chris Zylka, Katrina Bowden and Gary Busey, with Ving Rhames, Paul Scheer and Christopher Lloyd reprising their roles from Piranha 3D. Piranha 3DD'' is set at a waterpark where the piranhas find a way through the pipes.

Following its release, it failed to generate the positive critical reaction of its predecessor and grossed only $8,493,728.

References

External links

 
 
 
 

2010 films
2010 3D films
American 3D films
2010s English-language films
2010s sex comedy films
2010 comedy horror films
American comedy horror films
American natural horror films
Remakes of American films
American splatter films
Horror film remakes
Films about piranhas
Films directed by Alexandre Aja
Films set in 2010
Films set in Arizona
Films shot in Arizona
Films with screenplays by Josh Stolberg
Films scored by Michael Wandmacher
Dimension Films films
The Weinstein Company films
Reboot films
American sex comedy films
Prehistoric life in popular culture
2010s American films